Veltoor (also Romanized as Velatoor, Velatur, and Veltur) is a village and gram panchayat in Peddamandadi mandal of Wanaparthy district of Telangana in India.

Geography
It is located just next to Dindi Dam, between Hyderabad and Srisailam on the highway.  The Nallamalla forests and Umamaheswaram Temple are about 10 km from the village and can be seen from the village. The nearest big town is Achampet.

References

Villages in Nagarkurnool district